Leavitt Group (formerly The Leavitt Group) is an organization of affiliated independent insurance agencies, with 200+ locations across the United States as of 2023.  According to the corporate website, Leavitt Group was founded in 1952 when Dixie Leavitt opened an insurance agency in the town of Cedar City, Utah, where the company headquarters remains located. It is among the largest retail property and casualty (P/C) insurance brokerage firms in the United States.

Subsidiaries 
Subsidiaries of Leavitt group include:
 Allegiance Premium Finance Co., LLC
 PacWest Captive Insurance Company
 Accident & Loss Prevention Services (ALPS)
 Mutual Insurance Services, Inc.

Relative size estimates 

Insurance Journal rankings among privately held retail P/C insurance agencies in the United States:
 In 2009, The Leavitt Group was reported to be the 15th largest property and casualty brokerage firm, with 2006 revenues of $150 million and total insurance premiums over $1.3 billion.
 In 2014 (based on 2013 total revenue), Insurance Journal ranked the Leavitt Group as the 10th largest, with $116 million P/C insurance revenue.
 In 2022, the company was ranked the 17th largest, with $262 million P/C insurance revenue and $121 other revenue.

References

External links
 Leavitt Group official website

Companies based in Utah
Insurance companies of the United States
Financial services companies established in 1952
1952 establishments in Utah